PlantCollections is an electronic database which will combine and store documented records of the diverse living plant collections of 16 botanical gardens and arboreta in the United States.

The project plans to  promote the sharing of information resources. Audiences served will include curatorial, taxonomic, conservation, weed science, ecology, horticulture, education and visitors.

Participating institutions
Sixteen botanic gardens have agreed to participate in two phases to develop, test and implement the project. The institutions are:
 Arnold Arboretum of Harvard University 
 Chicago Botanic Garden
 Ganna Walska Lotusland, Santa Barbara, CA 
 Highstead Arboretum
 Huntington Library Museum and Botanical Gardens
 George Landis Arboretum
 Missouri Botanical Garden
 Morton Arboretum
 Mt. Cuba Center
 Norfolk Botanical Garden
 North Carolina Arboretum
 San Francisco Botanical Garden at Strybing Arboretum 
 Santa Barbara Botanic Garden
 Scott Arboretum of Swarthmore College
 United States National Arboretum
 University of Washington Botanic Gardens, Seattle, Washington

The project is funded by a National Leadership grant from the Institute of Museum and Library Services (IMLS)  The collaboration is led by the Chicago Botanic Garden, the University of Kansas Biodiversity Research Center and Natural History Museum and the North American Plant Collections Consortium of the American Public Gardens Association (APGA) . 

BG-Base, a manufacturer of proprietary software applications for the botanic garden community, has created an export module for participants utilizing their software applications. 

The software applications to be utilized include Web Applications for the Semantic Architecture of Biodiversity Information (WASABI) - an advanced generation  Distributed Generic Information Retrieval (DiGIR) - for the data provider and portal, Google Maps for maps and MorphBank for images. 

The intended data users were surveyed, and feedback from the eight audiences comprising curators, taxonomists, educators, horticulturists, ecologists, weed scientists, conservation scientists and gardeners defined the 161 fields found in the federated schema. 

Deliverables of the project include a federated schema, improved website for the APGA, development of software applications, servers for each institution and training of staff at each institution.

See also
Plant ontology

Botany
Biological databases
Arnold Arboretum